The following is a list of all of the commanders of the Foreign Legion (Légion étrangère)


Commanders of the Foreign Legion

Commanders of Foreign Legion Command (COMLE)

Commanders of Groupement de la Légion étrangère (GLE)

Commanders of the 1st Foreign Regiment

Commanders of the 1st Foreign Regiment of the Foreign Legion (1841-1856)

Commanders of the 1st Foreign Parachute Regiment

Commanders of the 2nd Foreign Cavalry Regiment
The 2nd Foreign Cavalry Regiment existed from 1939 to 1940 and 1946 to 1962; during its existence the regiment was led by ten different officers.

Commanders of the 2nd Foreign Engineer Regiment
The 2nd Foreign Engineer Regiment is the youngest of all the regiments of the Foreign Legion having been established on  July 1, 1999.

Commanders of the 2nd Foreign Infantry Regiment

Commander of the 2nd Foreign Regiment
Following the Crimean War, the elements of the two regiments which had participated in the war returned to Algeria and were consolidated into a single regiment thereafter referred to as the 2nd Foreign Regiment.

Commanders of the 2nd Regiment of the Foreign Legion (1841-1855)

Commanders of the 2nd Foreign Parachute Regiment

Commanders of the 3rd Foreign Infantry Regiment

Commanders of the 3rd REI from 1945 to Present

Commanders of the 3rd REI between 1920 and 1942

Commanders of the 4th Foreign Regiment

Commanders of the 4th Foreign Regiment

Commanders of the 5th Foreign Infantry Regiment

Commanders of the 5th Foreign Infantry Regiment (1931-1945)

Commanders of the 6th Foreign Infantry Regiment

Commanders of the 6th Foreign Infantry Regiment (1939-1941)

Commanders of the 6th Foreign Infantry Regiment (1949-1955)

Commanders of the Old Legion
The Old Foreign Legion was established on March 9, 1831 and for the next several years the Legion quickly cycled through a number of officers until it was deployed to Spain to fight in the First Carlist War, after that deployment the pace of the change of leadership slowed down as the Foreign Legion enjoyed the leadershiper of able and skilled officers. However following taking catastrophic losses in Spain the French government at the time thought it best to disband this organization.

Commanders of 13th Demi-Brigade

Commanders of the Foreign Legion Detachment in Mayotte

References

French Foreign Legion